Charaf is a surname. Notable people with the surname include:

 Rafic Charaf (1932–2003), Lebanese painter
 Saida Charaf (born 1981), Moroccan singer
 Wafae Charaf (born 1988), Moroccan human rights activist